Sini-Maria Makkonen (born 22 February 1986), professionally known as Sini Sabotage, is a Finnish rapper.

Career

Sini Sabotage started her career by appearing as a featured artist on albums by Cheek and JVG and by doing DJ gigs. In 2013, she was signed to PME Records, founded by JVG, and released her breakthrough single "Levikset repee" in April. The song peaked at number one on the Finnish Singles Chart.

Sini Sabotage served as one of the judges on the sixth season of the Finnish television show Idols in 2013. Her debut album 22 m² was released on 5 December 2013.

Discography

Albums

Singles

As a featured artist

References

Living people
1986 births
Finnish rappers
Finnish hip hop musicians
Finnish women rappers